Kalyuzhny is a surname which is spelled variously in different languages. Some languages also have a feminine form.
The surname derives from the  word meaning "pool" or "puddle" in some Slavic languages, e.g., Polish: kałuża,  Czech:kaluž.

People
 Alexei Kalyuzhny (born 1977), Belarusian ice hockey player
 Ivan Kalyuzhnyi (born 1998), Ukrainian footballer
 Olga Kalyuzhnaya (born 1982), Russian tennis player
 Radosław Kałużny (born 1974), Polish footballer
 Viktoriia Kaliuzhna (born 1994), Ukrainian long-distance runner

See also
 Doctor Kalyuzhnyy
 Kałużna (disambiguation)

Belarusian-language surnames
Polish-language surnames
Ukrainian-language surnames